Plaza del Mercado de Manatí is a historic marketplace building in Manatí, Puerto Rico. It was the first structure that tried to house under one roof, all the market functions that until 1925 were carried out in an open lot on Padial Street. This new typology was for meeting health and hygiene regulations introduced by the United States government. Constructing the building in the place of the original market helped preserve the continuity of uses and the commercial character of this part of Manatí barrio-pueblo, the downtown area of the municipality of Manatí.

The building, oriented from north to south, is located in the town square of Manatí and opens onto two streets. On Padial Street, the building is at the ground level but on Quiñones Street there is a  difference, which required the construction of a monumental staircase. This difference in level allowed for the design of a basement which served as a warehouse and commercial space.

Gallery

References

External links
 

		
Commercial buildings completed in 1925
Commercial buildings on the National Register of Historic Places in Puerto Rico
1925 establishments in Puerto Rico
Art Deco architecture in Puerto Rico
National Register of Historic Places in Manatí, Puerto Rico
Retail markets
Spanish Revival architecture in Puerto Rico